This Changes Everything is a 2015 documentary film directed by Avi Lewis. It is based on the book This Changes Everything: Capitalism vs. the Climate by Naomi Klein.

The film is a Canada-United States coproduction.

At the 2015 Toronto International Film Festival, the film was first runner-up for the People's Choice Award: Documentaries.

Synopsis 
The film surveys a number of environmental activists around the world:

 Alberta, Canada— Crystal, a young indigenous Beaver Lake Cree Nation leader in Athabasca oil sands country, fights for access to a restricted military base.
 Powder River Basin, Montana— Mike and Alexis, a goat ranching couple impacted by oil from a broken pipeline. They organize against fossil fuel extraction and form an alliance with the Northern Cheyenne tribe to bring solar power to the nearby reservation.
 Halkidiki, Greece— Melachrini, a housewife opposed to mining and drilling projects by Canadian corporation Eldorado Gold; against the backdrop of Greece in crisis.
 Andhra Pradesh, India— Jyothi, a matriarch fighting a proposed coal-fired power plant that will destroy a wetland. 
 China— Smog-choked Beijing.

Reception

Box office
The domestic box office total as of 2020 is $16,692.

Reviews
The film received a mixed reaction from film critics. It garnered a 56% rating at Rotten Tomatoes, based on 16 reviews. At Metacritic, which assigns a weighted average score out of 100 to reviews from mainstream critics, the film has received a mixed or average score of 59, based on seven reviews.

Writing for the Los Angeles Times, critic Michael Rechtshaffen wrote: "They may not do enough to alter the climate change film landscape, but Klein and those impassioned protesters provide something that has been in short supply in the predecessors — namely, a modicum of hope for the future."

Writing for The Guardian, reviewer Henry Barnes stated that the "implication [of the film's opening confession from the author that she's 'always kind of hated films about climate change'] is that This Changes Everything is going to excite and inspire in a way that climate change documentaries have failed to before. It really doesn’t. It gives those of us in the affluent parts of the world more reason to feel bad and only a suggestion of what to do with that feeling."

References

External links
 Official website
 
 Official Facebook
 Naomi Klein and Avi Lewis on their documentary This Changes Everything, an interview on Day 6 (CBC Radio; 18 September 2015) 
 This Changes Everything: Naomi Klein & Avi Lewis Film Re-imagines Vast Challenge of Climate Change (Pt. 1) and (Pt. 2), an interview on Democracy Now! (2 October 2015)
 Excerpt from the film, on YouTube

Documentary films about global warming
American documentary films
Canadian documentary films
2015 films
2015 documentary films
Naomi Klein
Films based on non-fiction books
2010s English-language films
2010s Canadian films
2010s American films